Lukid (real name Luke Blair) is an electronic music producer from London, England. He has released three albums on Werkdiscs, as well as EPs on Liberation Technologies, and his own label Glum.

Blair is also one half of the duo Rezzett, who have released several records on London based record label The Trilogy Tapes, including a self-titled album in 2018.

In 2018 he also created a new pseudonym, Refreshers, releasing material on a record label of the same name.

In 2013, he was discussed in the Guardian with regard to the video for his song "Riquelme", which is named after footballer Juan Román Riquelme. Blair produced the video along with his brother, Sam Blair.

Since 2013 Blair has hosted a monthly show on NTS Radio.

Education 
Blair was educated at Highgate Wood Secondary School, a state school in North London.

Discography
Onandon (2007)
Foma (2009)
Chord (2010)
Lonely at the Top (2012)

References

British electronic musicians
Musicians from London
Living people
Year of birth missing (living people)
Ninja Tune artists